The Canberra Demons (formerly known as the Eastlake Football Club) is a semi-professional Australian rules football club based in the inner-south of Canberra, in the Australian Capital Territory. The senior team competed in the North East Australian Football League (NEAFL) from the league's founding in 2011 until it was absorbed by the Victorian Football League (VFL) in 2021. Canberra declined to join the expanded VFL.

In January 2016, the league announced that Eastlake would rebrand and now be known as Canberra, though the Eastlake name would live on in local competitions.

Former jumpers

Notable players
 Craig Bolton
 Tony Bourke
 Josh Bruce
 Nathan Clarke
 Ben Collins
 Brad Fuller
 Allan Hird, Jr.
 Alex Jesaulenko
 Aaron Rogers
 Jeremy Turner
 Rodney Broadhurst

See also
 Manuka Oval
 AFL Canberra
 Manuka Football Club

References

External links

 
 
 Eastlake FC (Archive, 13 Jan 2014)
 Australian Football profile for Eastlake

AFL Canberra clubs
1926 establishments in Australia
Australian rules football clubs established in 1926